Beitstad Church is a parish church of the Church of Norway in Steinkjer municipality in Trøndelag county, Norway. It is located in the village of Beitstad. It is the main church for the Beitstad parish which is part of the Stiklestad prosti (deanery) in the Diocese of Nidaros. The white, wooden church was built in a long church style in 1869 using plans drawn up by the architect Jacob Wilhelm Nordan. The church seats about 700 people.  The church was originally called Solberg Church.

History
The earliest existing historical records of the church date back to the year 1432, but the church was not new that year.

In 1814, this church served as an election church. Together with more than 300 other parish churches across Norway, it was a polling station for elections to the 1814 Norwegian Constituent Assembly which wrote the Constitution of Norway. This was Norway's first national elections. Each church parish was a constituency that elected people called "electors" who later met together in each county to elect the representatives for the assembly that was to meet in Eidsvoll later that year.

By the 1860s, the church was too small for the parish so in 1863, the parish decided to get permission to replace the old church. In 1869, the old church was torn down and replaced with a new wooden long church on the same site. Rasmus Overrein was the lead builder for the new church. It was consecrate on 19 September 1869. The church was renovated in 1932 using the designs of Roar Tønseth.

See also
List of churches in Nidaros

References

Steinkjer
Churches in Trøndelag
Long churches in Norway
Wooden churches in Norway
19th-century Church of Norway church buildings
Churches completed in 1869
13th-century establishments in Norway
Norwegian election church